Peckman may refer to:

Peckman River, a tributary of the Passaic River in New Jersey
Peckman Preserve, 12-acre nature preserve in Little Falls, New Jersey, United States
Jeff Peckman, an American UFO disclosure activist as well as a political candidate for the Natural Law Party